Juan Calderón may refer to:
 Juan Calderón (field hockey) (born 1947), Mexican field hockey player
 Juan Calderón (soccer) (born 2004), American soccer player
 Juan José Calderón (born 1991), Mexican footballer